The 2013 Malaysia FAM League (referred to as the FAM League) is the 61st season of the FAM League since its establishment in 1952. The league is currently the third level football league in Malaysia. The season began on 17 February 2013. Suruhanjaya Perkhidmatan Awam FC are the defending champions, having won their first league title the previous season.

Penang won the league for the 5th time in the league history after beating Shahzan Muda on 2 June 2013. This is the first FAM League title Penang has won since 1957. PBAPP FC, another team from Penang, also were promoted after capturing second place.

Teams

The following teams participated in the 2013 Malaysia FAM League. In order by the number given by FAM:-

 YBU FC ( New Team )
 Kuantan FA ( New Team )
 Malacca FA
 PBAPP FC
 Penang FA
 Shahzan Muda SC
 PB Melayu Kedah ( New Team )
 Cebagoo FC ( New Team )
 Tumpat FA ( New Team )
 Tentera Darat FC
 Harimau Muda C ( New Team )

To Malaysia Premier League

 KL SPA FC
 UiTM FC

New team

 Kuantan FA
 Tumpat FA
 Cebagoo FC
 Harimau Muda C
 PB Melayu Kedah
 Perak YBU FC

Withdrawn team

 MP Muar FC (From 2012 Malaysia Premier League)
 Penang USM FC (From 2012 Malaysia Premier League)
 MBJB FC (From 2012 Malaysia Premier League)

Teams

Team summaries

Stadium

Personnel and kits
Note: Flags indicate national team as has been defined under FIFA eligibility rules. Players and Managers may hold more than one non-FIFA nationality.

Stadium changes

League table

Results

Week 1

Week 2

Week 3

Week 4

Week 5

Week 6

Week 7

Week 8

Week 9

Week 10

Week 11

Week 12

Week 13

Week 14

Week 15

Week 16

Week 17

Week 18

Week 19

Week 20

Week 21

Week 22

Fixtures and results

Champions

Records
 Largest winning margin: 7 goals
PB Melayu Kedah 0–7 PBAPP (16 June 2013)
 Highest scoring game: 9 goals
PB Melayu Kedah 2–7 Penang (6 March 2013)
 Most goals scored in a match by a single team: 7 goals
PB Melayu Kedah 2–7 Penang (6 March 2013)
 Most goals scored in a match by a losing team: 2 goals
Perak YBU 2–3 Penang  (3 March 2013)
Tentera Darat 4–2 Tumpat (3 March 2013)
PB Melayu Kedah 2–7 Penang (6 March 2013)
Cebagoo FC 2–3 Tentera Darat (10 March 2013)
Harimau Muda C 2–3 PBAPP FC (20 March 2013)
Melaka 3–2 Tentera Darat (24 March 2013)
Kuantan FA 3–2 Penang  (8 May 2013)
Tentera Darat 2–5 Penang (19 May 2013)
 Most clean sheets: 10
Penang

Champions

See also
 2013 Malaysia Super League
 2013 Malaysia Premier League
 2013 Malaysia FA Cup

References

External links
 Football Association of Malaysia

2013
3